The Brian Jonestown Massacre is an American musical project and band led and started by Anton Newcombe. It was formed in San Francisco in 1990.

The group was the subject of the 2004 documentary film called Dig!, and have gained media notoriety for their tumultuous working relationships as well as the erratic behavior of Newcombe. The collective has released 20 albums, five compilation albums, five live albums, 14 EPs, 22 singles as well as two various-artist compilation albums to date.

The bandname is a portmanteau of deceased Rolling Stones founder Brian Jones and the 1978 Jonestown Massacre.

Releases

1993–1996: Early years

The collective was founded by Anton Newcombe in San Francisco between 1990 and 1993. Their first albums were compilations of recording sessions and an early demo tape, titled Pol Pot's Pleasure Penthouse. This release became a popular bootleg.

A second album, Spacegirl and Other Favorites, was released in 1993 as a vinyl-only release and was compiled from what Newcombe called his "studio trash". The album includes "Hide and Seek", which was released as a single in 1994. The band's follow-up album, Methodrone, was developed largely out of the concepts explored on Spacegirl and heavily influenced by the shoegaze genre that had gained prominence several years prior to its release. The album's ethereal rock sound is comparable to bands such as Galaxie 500, Spacemen 3 and My Bloody Valentine. Two tracks from the album, "She Made Me" and "Evergreen," were released as a double A-side single in 1992. Methodrone was recorded primarily at a studio in the Hunter's Point region of San Francisco called The Compound, where Naut Humon provided an environment for Newcombe to record for hours on end.

Over the next couple of years, the band shifted its sound from their more shoegaze, goth, and dream pop influences of the '80s and '90s into a '60s retro-futurist aesthetic. As line-up changes persisted, the band continued to record and in 1996 released three full-length studio albums. The first of these, Take It from the Man!, is rooted heavily in the maximum rhythm and blues aesthetic of the 1960s British Invasion. The album includes the song "Straight Up and Down," which was later used as theme music for the HBO television drama series Boardwalk Empire (201014), and was engineered by Larry Thrasher of the influential group Psychic TV. 

The band's second album released in 1996, Their Satanic Majesties' Second Request reflects a pastiche of 1960s psychedelia. The album also includes vast experimentation with a variety of different instrumentation including Indian drones, sitars, Mellotrons, farfisas, didgeridoos, tablas, congas, and glockenspiels. The title of the album is a play on words of the Rolling Stones' 1967 album Their Satanic Majesties Request.

The third and final album released that year was Thank God for Mental Illness, a more stripped-down effort. Since the band did not have a drummer at the time, Newcombe took the opportunity to showcase more of his acoustic songwriting. The album explores more in-depth genres such as country and folk. At the end of the album Newcombe included an entire EP called Sound of Confusion, compiled largely from earlier BJM recordings. Sound of Confusion features both regular songs and more abstract sound collages.

1997–1998: Give It Back!, signing to TVT and Strung Out in Heaven

The Brian Jonestown Massacre recorded their sixth album, Give It Back!, in 1997 after relocating to Los Angeles from San Francisco. The album was tracked in a few short days leading up to the band's first US tour and includes the track, "Not If You Were the Last Dandy on Earth", a sardonic reply to The Dandy Warhols' single "Not If You Were the Last Junkie on Earth", which had been perceived at the time as being directed at the BJM. "Not If You Were the Last Dandy on Earth" was featured on the soundtrack to Jim Jarmusch's 2005 film Broken Flowers. During this time, the BJM signed with TVT Records. This led to the release of the band's seventh full-length album, Strung Out in Heaven, in 1998, as well as their first-ever tours of the UK and Japan. Strung Out in Heaven did not sell as many records as TVT had hoped, and the relationship between the label and the band deteriorated. TVT eventually dissolved its remaining contractual obligations with the band.

1999–2005: Bring It All Back Home – Again, Bravery Repetition and Noise, And This Is Our Music and We Are the Radio

In 1999, Which? Records released the EP, Bringing It All Back Home – Again, a collection of songs largely written and recorded around the time the band were working on Give It Back! and Strung Out in Heaven. In 2001, the band released their eighth studio album, Bravery Repetition and Noise, which included the track "Sailor", a re-work of a song originally performed by The Cryan' Shames.

In 2003, the band released their ninth studio album, And This Is Our Music. And This Is Our Music was a step in a new direction for Newcombe and the group creatively, and emphasized more of the electronic music Newcombe had explored in the beginning days of the group. The album's title has been called a reference to the identically-titled, but distinct, albums This Is Our Music by the artists Galaxie 500 and Ornette Coleman.

In 2005, the band released the EP We Are the Radio on Newcombe's own label, The Committee to Keep Music Evil, which features a close collaboration with independent singer-songwriter Sarabeth Tucek. This was the last BJM record to be recorded in the United States, as shortly after this Newcombe relocated to Europe.

2008–present: Experimental music and recent releases

The Brian Jonestown Massacre released their tenth studio album, My Bloody Underground, in 2008 on Cargo Records. The album is directly inspired by the music made by bands My Bloody Valentine and The Velvet Underground. The record contains a highly experimental approach, and was recorded in collaboration with Mark Gardener, formerly of Ride, who co-wrote the song "Monkey Powder". The Brian Jonestown Massacre recorded both of their next releases in Iceland and Berlin.

An EP entitled One was released in November 2009 and featured the tracks "One", "This Is the First of Your Last Warning" (which also appears on their next album, Who Killed Sgt. Pepper?), an English version of "This Is The First of Your Last Warning", and then exclusive track, "Bruttermania".

Who Killed Sgt. Pepper?, the band's eleventh studio album, was released in February 2010. It featured musicians Unnur Andrea Einarsdottir (who recorded vocals on My Bloody Underground), Felix Bondareff from the Russian band Amazing Electronic Talking Cave, as well as the musician Will Carruthers. Soon after the album's release, it was confirmed that Matt Hollywood had returned to the band after an eleven-year absence. According to Newcombe, he would feature on the band's next album and also toured with the band.

The Brian Jonestown Massacre released the album Aufheben on May 1, 2012. Newcombe stated that the album's title relates to Georg Wilhelm Friedrich Hegel's use of the term, whereby something is destroyed in order to preserve it.

Revelation, the band's thirteenth studio album, was released in May 2014. It is the first album to be fully recorded and produced at Newcombe's recording studio in Berlin. Stylistically, the album mixes the traditional Brian Jonestown Massacre sound with Eastern influences.

Their next album, Musique de Film Imaginé, was released on April 27, 2015. The album was conceived as a soundtrack for an imaginary French film, and pays homage to European film directors of the late 1950s and 1960s such as François Truffaut and Jean-Luc Godard. It was recorded in Berlin in August 2014.

In October 2016, the band released the album Third World Pyramid, which was preceded by the single "The Sun Ship".

In February 2017, their 16th album Don't get Lost was released, preceded by seven singles.

Their 17th album, Something Else was released in June 2018.

The following year in March 2019, the band released a self titled album.

In March 2022, the band announced that two albums, Fire Doesn't Grow on Trees and Your Future Is Your Past were scheduled to be released in June and October of 2022 respectively.

The studio album Fire Doesn't Grow on Trees was released in June 2022.

Documentary

Along with Portland, Oregon alternative rock band The Dandy Warhols, The Brian Jonestown Massacre were the subjects of the 2004 documentary film Dig!. The film captured a love–hate relationship between both bands, highlighting the interaction of Newcombe with his counterpart in the Warhols, Courtney Taylor-Taylor. The film was recorded over the course of seven years by filmmaker Ondi Timoner, but largely focused on The Brian Jonestown Massacre from late 1996 to mid-1998. Dig! won the Documentary Grand Jury Prize at the 2004 Sundance Film Festival.

Members

Discography

Studio albums
 Methodrone (1995)
 Spacegirl and Other Favorites (1995)
 Take It from the Man! (1996)
 Their Satanic Majesties' Second Request (1996)
 Thank God for Mental Illness (1996)
 Give It Back! (1997)
 Strung Out in Heaven (1998)
 Bravery Repetition and Noise (2001)
 ...And This Is Our Music (2003)
 My Bloody Underground (2008)
 Who Killed Sgt. Pepper? (2010)
 Aufheben (2012)
 Revelation (2014)
 Musique de Film Imaginé (2015)
 Mini Album Thingy Wingy (2015)
 Third World Pyramid (2016)
 Don't Get Lost (2017)
 Something Else (2018)
 The Brian Jonestown Massacre (2019)
 Fire Doesn't Grow on Trees (2022)
 Your Future Is Your Past (2023)

References

External links

Official website

1988 establishments in California
Garage rock groups from California
Bomp! Records artists
Folk rock groups from California
Musical groups from San Francisco
Musical groups established in 1988
Neo-psychedelia groups
Psychedelic rock music groups from California
TVT Records artists
Birdman Records artists